Gerry Ryan Tonight is an Irish chat show hosted by Gerry Ryan that aired for three series on Network 2 between 1995 and 1997. The studio-based show featured guest interviews and live music. Gerry Ryan Tonight aired twice weekly for the first season and once a week for all subsequent seasons.

References

1995 Irish television series debuts
1997 Irish television series endings
Irish television talk shows
RTÉ original programming